Monte de Fralães is a former civil parish, located in the municipality of Barcelos, Portugal. In 2013, the parish merged into the new parish Viatodos, Grimancelos, Minhotães e Monte de Fralães. The population in 2011 was 408, in an area of 1.58 km².

The parish's patron saint is St. Peter and his feast has been celebrated for four centuries every 15 August by the Confraternity of Our Lady of Health.

The actual parish church was in ancient times the chapel of the Correias, a local noble family. Deeply modified, it is today a small and beautiful temple, which has substituted, since 1913, for the former church. It possesses a remarkable 18th-century talha (gilt wood) altar. Remarkable also, dating from the 1910s, are the two lateral retables which receive the images of the Sacred Heart of Jesus and Our Lady of Health.

The parish, that was born in the Mount of Assaia, where there was a very ancient town, a citânia, had some important priests, like Jácome Dias (16th century), João Rodrigues de Carvalho and the writer João Rosa (19th century). Its original name was S. Cristóvão de Silveiros (11th century), as can be seen in the Censual do Bispo D. Pedro.

In the 13th century Monte de Fralães (then S. Pedro do Monte) was born, the great conqueror Paio Peres Correia.

In the 14th century, in the Solar of the Correias (Solar of Fralães), has been created the Municipality of Fralães, known as Honra de Fralães (that included also Viatodos and part of Silveiros); it would be extinguished in December 1836. Varied documentation of this autarchy is conserved in the parish and in Barcelos archives.

The pianist and composer Luís Costa was born in Monte de Fralães.

References

Former parishes of Barcelos, Portugal